Sangeetha Mohan is a former Indian female high jumper. She has represented India at the 2004 Asian Junior Athletics Championships and 2004 South Asian Games. Sangeetha clinched gold medal in the women's high jump at the 2004 South Asian Games and in fact, set the women's high jump record of 1.81m at the South Asian Games history. She also secured a bronze medal in the women's high jump at the 2004 Asian Junior Athletics Championships held in Malaysia.

See also 
 List of South Asian Games records in athletics

References 

Living people
Indian female high jumpers
21st-century Indian women
21st-century Indian people
Place of birth missing (living people)
Year of birth missing (living people)
South Asian Games gold medalists for India
South Asian Games medalists in athletics